The Land of Punt (Egyptian:  pwnt; alternate Egyptological readings Pwene(t) /pu:nt/) was an ancient kingdom known from Ancient Egyptian trade records. It produced and exported gold, aromatic resins, blackwood, ebony, ivory and wild animals. It is possible that it corresponds to Opone in Somalia, as later known by the ancient Greeks, while some biblical scholars have identified it with the biblical land of Put or Havilah.

At times Punt is referred to as Ta netjer (tꜣ nṯr), the "Land of the God". The exact location of Punt is debated by historians. Various locations have been offered, southeast of Egypt, a Red Sea coastal region:  Somaliland, Somalia, Djibouti, northeast Ethiopia, Eritrea, and north-east Sudan. It is also possible that it covered both the Horn of Africa and Southern Arabia. Puntland, the Somali administrative region at the end of the Horn of Africa is named in reference to it.

Egyptian expeditions to Punt

The earliest recorded ancient Egyptian expedition to Punt was organized by Pharaoh Sahure of the Fifth Dynasty (25th century BC), returning with cargoes of antyue and Puntites. However, gold from Punt is recorded as having been in Egypt as early as the time of Pharaoh Khufu of the Fourth Dynasty.

Subsequently, there were more expeditions to Punt in the Sixth, Eleventh, Twelfth and Eighteenth dynasties of Egypt. In the Twelfth Dynasty, trade with Punt was celebrated in popular literature in the Tale of the Shipwrecked Sailor.

In the reign of Mentuhotep III (11th dynasty, ca. 2000 BC), an officer named Hannu organized one or more voyages to Punt, but it is uncertain whether he personally traveled on these expeditions. Trading missions of the 12th dynasty pharaohs Senusret I, Amenemhat II and Amenemhat IV had also successfully navigated their way to and from the mysterious land of Punt.

In the Eighteenth Dynasty of Egypt, Hatshepsut built a Red Sea fleet to facilitate trade between the head of the Gulf of Aqaba and points south as far as Punt to bring mortuary goods to Karnak in exchange for Nubian gold. Hatshepsut personally made the most famous ancient Egyptian expedition that sailed to Punt. Her artists revealing much about the royals, inhabitants, habitation and variety of trees on the island, revealing it as the "Land of the Gods, a region far to the east in the direction of the sunrise, blessed with products for religious purposes", where traders returned with gold, ivory, ebony, incense, aromatic resins, animal skins, live animals, eye-makeup cosmetics, fragrant woods, and cinnamon. During the reign of Queen Hatshepsut in the 15th century BC, ships regularly crossed the Red Sea in order to obtain bitumen, copper, carved amulets, naptha and other goods transported overland and down the Dead Sea to Elat at the head of the gulf of Aqaba where they were joined with frankincense and myrrh coming north both by sea and overland along trade routes through the mountains running north along the east coast of the Red Sea.

A report of that five-ship voyage survives on reliefs in Hatshepsut's mortuary temple at Deir el-Bahri. Throughout the temple texts, Hatshepsut "maintains the fiction that her envoy" Chancellor Nehsi, who is mentioned as the head of the expedition, had travelled to Punt "in order to extract tribute from the natives" who admit their allegiance to the Egyptian pharaoh. In reality, Nehsi's expedition was a simple trading mission to a land, Punt, which was by this time a well-established trading post. Moreover, Nehsi's visit to Punt was not inordinately brave since he was "accompanied by at least five shiploads of [Egyptian] marines" and greeted warmly by the chief of Punt and his immediate family. The Puntites "traded not only in their own produce of incense, ebony and short-horned cattle, but [also] in goods from other African states including gold, ivory and animal skins." According to the temple reliefs, the Land of Punt was ruled at that time by King Parahu and Queen Ati. This well illustrated expedition of Hatshepsut occurred in Year 9 of the female pharaoh's reign with the blessing of the god Amun:

While the Egyptians "were not particularly well versed in the hazards of sea travel, and the long voyage to Punt must have seemed something akin to a journey to the moon for present-day explorers... the rewards of [obtaining frankincense, ebony and myrrh] clearly outweighed the risks." An extensive account of the expedition, based on the tableaux, was provided by Amelia Edwards in 1891.

According to Stuart Tyson Smith, Egyptologist and professor of anthropology at University of California, Santa Barbara, "The scene of an expedition to Punt from Queen Hatshepsuis mortuary complex at Deir el-Bahri shows Puntites with red skin and facial features similar to Egyptians, long or bobbed hair, goatee beards, and kilts".

Hatshepsut's 18th dynasty successors, such as Thutmose III and Amenhotep III, also continued the Egyptian tradition of trading with Punt. The trade with Punt continued into the start of the 20th dynasty before terminating prior to the end of Egypt's New Kingdom. Papyrus Harris I, a contemporary Egyptian document that details events that occurred in the reign of the early 20th dynasty king Ramesses III, includes an explicit description of an Egyptian expedition's return from Punt:

After the end of the New Kingdom period, Punt became "an unreal and fabulous land of myths and legends." However, Egyptians continued to compose love songs about Punt, "When I hold my love close, and her arms steal around me, I'm like a man translated to Punt, or like someone out in the reedflats, when the world suddenly bursts into flower."

Ta netjer
At times, the ancient Egyptians called Punt Ta netjer (tꜣ nṯr), meaning "God's Land". This referred to the fact that it was among the regions of the Sun God, that is, the regions located in the direction of the sunrise, to the East of Egypt. These eastern regions' resources included products used in temples, notably incense. Older literature maintained that the label "God's Land", when interpreted as "Holy Land" or "Land of the gods/ancestors", meant that the ancient Egyptians viewed the Land of Punt as their ancestral homeland. W. M. Flinders Petrie believed that the Dynastic Race came from or through Punt and that "Pan, or Punt, was a district at the south end of the Red Sea, which probably embraced both the African and Arabian shores." Moreover, E. A. Wallis Budge stated that "Egyptian tradition of the Dynastic Period held that the aboriginal home of the Egyptians was Punt...". James Breasted in 1906 argued that the term Ta netjer was not only applied to Punt, located southeast of Egypt, but also to regions of Asia east and northeast of Egypt, such as Lebanon, which was the source of wood for temples.

On the murals of the Hatshepsut temple at Deir el-Bahri, the King and Queen of Punt are depicted along with their retinue. Due to her unusual appearance, the Queen was sometimes hypothesized to have had advanced steatopygia or elephantiasis.

Proposed locations

Horn of Africa
The majority opinion places Punt in the Horn of Africa, based on the fact that the products of Punt (as depicted in the Hatshepsut illustrations) were abundantly found in the Horn of Africa but were less common or sometimes absent in Arabia. These products included gold and aromatic resins such as myrrh, frankincense, and ebony; the wild animals depicted in Punt included giraffes, baboons, hippopotami, and leopards. Richard Pankhurst states: "[Punt] has been identified with territory on both the Arabian and the Horn of Africa coasts. Consideration of the articles that the Egyptians obtained from Punt, notably gold and ivory, suggests, however, that these were primarily of African origin. ... This leads us to suppose that the term Punt probably applied more to African than Arabian territory."

In 2003, Ian Shaw wrote that "There is still some debate regarding the precise location of Punt, which was once identified with the region of modern Somalia. A strong argument has now been made for its location in either southern Sudan or the Eritrean region of Ethiopia, where the indigenous plants and animals equate most closely with those depicted in the Egyptian reliefs and paintings".

According to Simon Najovits, the area comprising Somalia, Djibouti, the Red Sea coast of Eritrea and Sudan in the Horn of Africa is considered the most likely location.

In 2010, researchers from the University of California, Santa Cruz analyzed hair from two mummified baboons using oxygen isotope analysis and were able to work out where they originated. The researchers compared the oxygen isotope samples in the ancient baboons to those found in their modern day brethren. The isotope samples in baboons in Somalia and Yemen did not match, but those in Eritrea and eastern Ethiopia did match. The research team concluded that Punt was most likely a circumscribed region that included eastern Ethiopia and all of Eritrea.

In June 2018, Polish archaeologists who have been conducting research in The Temple of Hatshepsut since 1961 discovered the only depiction of a secretary bird (Sagittarius serpentarius) known from ancient Egypt in the Bas-reliefs from the Portico of Punt that depicted the great Pharaonic expedition to the Land of Punt. The secretary bird lives only in the African open grasslands and savannah, it is listed among the birds found in Sudan, Ethiopia, Eritrea, Djibouti, and Somaliland, the bird is not found in Arabia.

It has been suggested that Punt might be located in eastern Sudan and western Eritrea where the Gash Group (about 3000 to 1800 BC) and later the Jebel Mokram Group flourished. Especially at Gash Group sites, many Egyptian pottery vessels and Egyptian faience beads were found, indicating close contacts with Egypt. Found Red Sea shells demonstrate contact with the Red Sea coast.

Arabian peninsula
Dimitri Meeks disagrees with the Horn of Africa hypothesis and points to ancient inscriptions that locate Punt in the western coast of the Arabian Peninsula, from the Gulf of Aqaba to Yemen, he has written that "Texts locating Punt beyond doubt to the south are in the minority, but they are the only ones cited in the current consensus about the location of the country. Punt, we are told by the Egyptians, is situated – in relation to the Nile Valley – both to the north, in contact with the countries of the Near East of the Mediterranean area, and also to the east or south-east, while its furthest borders are far away to the south. Only the Arabian Peninsula satisfies all these indications."

Others 
Some scholars have argued that Punt is the early Pandyan island of Tamraparni, present day Sri Lanka. An artifact datable to the Fifth Dynasty was originally stated to be made from Diospyros ebenum wood, a tree which is originally of Southern India and Sri Lanka. However, such identification is now considered unconfirmed because of the unlikelihood of such an early contact between Egypt and the Indian subcontinent, together with the difficulty of correctly identifying a plant specimen dead for thousands of years.

Punt as depicted by Ancient Egypt

See also 

 Ophir, an unidentified place mentioned in the Hebrew Bible as a source of riches for Solomon's Temple
 Tarshish, another unidentified place mentioned in the Bible

Notes

References
 .
 .

 Fattovich, Rodolfo. 1991. "The Problem of Punt in the Light of the Recent Field Work in the Eastern Sudan". In Akten des vierten internationalen Ägyptologen Kongresses, München 1985, edited by Sylvia Schoske. Vol. 4 of 4 vols. Hamburg: Helmut Buske Verlag. 257–272.
 ———. 1993. "Punt: The Archaeological Perspective". In Sesto congresso internazionale de egittologia: Atti, edited by Gian Maria Zaccone and Tomaso Ricardi di Netro. Vol. 2 of 2 vols. Torino: Italgas. 399–405.
 Herzog, Rolf. 1968. Punt. Abhandlungen des Deutsches Archäologischen Instituts Kairo, Ägyptische Reihe 6. Glückstadt: Verlag J. J. Augustin.
 
 .
 .
 .
 O'Connor, David (1994), Ancient Nubia: Egypt's Rival in Africa, University of Pennsylvania Press, pp. 41–44.
 Wicker, F. D. P. (July, 1998), "The Road to Punt", The Geographical Journal. Vol. 164, no. 2. 155-167

Further reading

Older literature
 Johannes Dümichen: Die Flotte einer ägyptischen Königin, Leipzig, 1868.
 
 Wilhelm Max Müller: Asien und Europa nach altägyptischen Denkmälern, Leipzig, 1893.
 Adolf Erman: Life in Ancient Egypt, London, 1894.
 Édouard Naville: "Deir-el-Bahri" in Egypt Exploration Fund, Memoirs XII, XIII, XIV, and XIX, London, 1894 et seq.
 James Henry Breasted: A History of the Ancient Egyptians, New York, 1908.

External links
  with quotes from Breasted (1906) and Petrie (1939)
 Queen Hatasu, and Her Expedition to the Land of Punt by Amelia Ann Blanford Edwards (1891)
 
  at Deir el-Bahri
  discussion by Dr. Karl H. Leser
 Queen of Punt syndrome

News reports on Wadi Gawasis excavations
 Archaeologists discover ancient ships in Egypt (Boston University Bridge, 18 March 2005). Excavations at Wadi Gawasis, possibly the ancient Egyptian port Saaw.
 Remains of ancient Egyptian seafaring ships discovered (New Scientist, 23 March 2005).
 
 
 4,000-year-old shipyard unearthed in Egypt (MSNBC, 6 March 2006).

 
Geography of ancient Egypt
Ancient Somalia
Countries in ancient Africa
History of the Red Sea
Foreign contacts of ancient Egypt
Historical regions
Lost places
South Arabia
Former kingdoms